The Country New South Wales rugby league team is a representative rugby league football team. Between 1987 and 2017 there were two tiers: the Origin team that consisted of professional players who originated from clubs of the Country Rugby League and a representative team of amateur and semi-professional players. The Country Origin team played annually in the City vs Country Origin competition against the City New South Wales rugby league team, which was made up of players originating from Sydney. This match was discontinued in 2017.

The representative team has played in a number of formats over the years: quad and tri series, annual fixtures and tour matches. The most recent change is the introduction of an Under 23 age limit to the top representative team. The Country Rugby League was absorbed by the New South Wales Rugby League at the end of 2019. The NSWRL continued to run competitions for country regions in February and March 2020 until they were curtailed by lockdown restrictions. This suggests that a NSW Country representative side will be reinstated in the future.

Men's Open Age Country Team 
The following players werre selected in the Country squad for the 2022 Open Age Men's match against City at Leichhardt Oval on Sunday, 15 May, 2022. The team is coached by Terry Campese.

CRL Team of the Century
In 2008, the centenary year of rugby league in Australia, the Country Rugby League named its "Team of the Century":

Kit suppliers and sponsors

2017 Country NSW squad

Women's City vs Country Match

City v Country Women's matches were occasionally played prior to the re-introduction of a stand-alone match in 2017. In 2018 and 2019 the games were played within the National Championships. The 2020 National Championships were cancelled due to the COVID-19 Pandemic in Australia. In 2021 the National Championships were reorganised, and an open age City v Country Women's Origin was scheduled separately from the National Championships.

2022 Squad 
The following players were selected in the Country Origin Women's team to play on Saturday, 14 May, 2022 at 4 Pines Park. The team is coached by Ruan Sims.

Notes:
 In the above tables J# = Jersey number, Dbt = Debut Year, S = Seasons, M = Matches, T = Tries, G = Goals
 Tallies in the table include the 2022 match. 
 Olivia Kernick played for the  Indigenous All Stars team in 2021 and for the  Māori All Stars team in 2022.

Matches

Country Firsts / Combined Country

Origin

Women's

Country Origin Player of the Year

See also

 List of Country Origin team players
 Sydney rugby league team
 Newcastle rugby league team
 Brisbane rugby league team

Sources

References

External links

 
Rugby league representative teams in New South Wales
City vs Country Origin
1911 establishments in Australia
2017 disestablishments in Australia